Antony Paul Gallacher (born 23 July 1999) is a Scottish professional footballer who plays for St Johnstone as a left back.

Club career

Falkirk
Gallacher joined Falkirk as a graduate from the Forth Valley Football Academy in the summer of 2015, having played for the club's youth teams since the age of 10. He made his debut as a sixteen-year-old in a Scottish Cup tie at home to Fraserburgh on 28 November 2015. He made his first league start in a Scottish Championship match against Dumbarton on 17 December 2016.

In January 2017, he was named as one of the Daily Record's and The Herald's Scottish footballing prospects for 2017. The latter reported that Gallacher had been scouted by Premier League sides Manchester United and Stoke City, as well as Scottish club Rangers.

Liverpool
On 25 January 2018, Liverpool signed Gallacher after a successful trial for a fee of £200,000. Gallacher made his competitive debut for Liverpool on 17 December 2019, starting in a 5–0 League Cup defeat at Aston Villa. Liverpool had decided to play a shadow team in that match due to a scheduling clash with the 2019 FIFA Club World Cup. He featured primarily with the Liverpool U23s in the Premier League 2 U23 league.

Toronto FC
On 14 September 2020, Gallacher joined Canadian club Toronto FC in Major League Soccer, on a loan until 31 December 2020. Due to the COVID-19 pandemic, he first had to complete a 14-day quarantine, and then the club had to play out the rest of the season in the United States, due to Canadian travel restrictions, meaning Gallacher did not get to spend any time in Toronto, instead spending the entire time on the road.

St Johnstone
Gallacher signed for St Johnstone in January 2022, on a contract that is due to run until the summer of 2024.

International career
Gallacher has been involved with Scotland at various youth age group levels.

Personal life
Tony is the nephew of Jim Gallacher and cousin of Paul Gallacher, both former goalkeepers.

Career statistics

Notes

References

External links

1999 births
Living people
Footballers from Glasgow
Scottish footballers
Scotland youth international footballers
Association football defenders
Falkirk F.C. players
Liverpool F.C. players
Scottish Professional Football League players
Toronto FC players
Major League Soccer players
Scottish expatriate sportspeople in Canada
Scottish expatriate footballers
Expatriate soccer players in Canada
St Johnstone F.C. players